Raymond Trewolla Littlejohns (13 August 1893 - 22 January 1961) was an Australian accountant, amateur ornithologist and bird photographer.

Reputation 
Littlejohns is especially known for his efforts in photography and sound recording of the lyrebirds of Sherbrooke Forest near Melbourne, Victoria.  Littlejohns joined the Royal Australasian Ornithologists Union (RAOU) in 1912 and served on its council for many years, including its presidency 1959–1960.

Publications 
Littlejohns was a contributor to Emu and to Walkabout and books he authored or coauthored include:
 Littlejohns, Raymond Trewolla; & Lawrence, S.A. (1920). Birds of Our Bush, or Photography for Nature-Lovers. Whitcombe & Tombs Ltd: Melbourne.
 Littlejohns, Raymond Trewolla. (1933). The Magic Voice. A story of the Australian Lyre-bird. Ramsay Publishing Pty Ltd: Melbourne.
 Littlejohns, Raymond Trewolla. (1938). The Lyre-Bird. Australia's wonder-songster. Angus & Robertson Ltd: Sydney.
 Littlejohns, Raymond Trewolla. (1947). Lyrebirds Calling from Australia. Robertson & Mullens: Melbourne.

Death
Raymond Littlejohns died on 22 January 1961 in Elwood, aged 67.

Memorial
Raymond Littlejohns is commemorated by the Ray T. Littlejohns Memorial Seat in Sherbrooke.

References

Australian accountants
Australian ornithologists
Australian photographers
Nature photographers
1893 births
1961 deaths
20th-century Australian zoologists